Inverurie Hospital is a small hospital in Inverurie, Aberdeenshire, Scotland. It is managed by NHS Grampian.

History
The hospital has its origins in an infectious diseases hospital in Cunninghill Road which opened in January 1897. It moved to a new 60-bed facility in Upperboat Road, which was designed by R. Leslie Rollo, in December 1940. It continued to deal with a wide range of infectious diseases from across Aberdeenshire. Following the eradication of many infectious diseases, single storey wards were re-designated for general medicine in 1958.

Services
The Minor Injury Unit Service in Inverurie is delivered by Inverurie Medical Practice at the Inverurie Health and Social Care Hub, during the hours of 8.30am-6pm Monday to Friday. There is no longer an out of hours Minor Injury Unit Service provided at Inverurie Hospital.

References 

NHS Grampian
NHS Scotland hospitals
Hospital buildings completed in 1940
Hospitals in Aberdeenshire
1897 establishments in Scotland
Hospitals established in 1897
Inverurie